TLC is a British pay television channel owned by Warner Bros. Discovery. It is based on the American channel of the same name.

The original version of TLC was launched in 1994 and was subsequently renamed Discovery Home & Leisure and later Discovery Real Time as part of Discovery's catalogue of themed channels. Given that TLC was chasing a completely different demographic than the old TLC, Discovery treated it as a new channel launch rather than a return.

On 30 April 2013, TLC +1 was launched, replacing DMAX +2.

A two-hour timeshift, TLC +2, was launched on 16 September 2013. It closed down on 27 April 2018, and was rebranded as Discovery Turbo +1.

Programming
Programming consists of acquired shows and original commissions. TLC also features an Oprah Winfrey Network branded programme block.

Current programming

Acquired shows

90 Day Fiancé
Beachfront Bargain Hunt
Brides of Beverly Hills
Cake Boss
Cheer Perfection
Curvy Brides
Extreme Couponing
Here Comes Honey Boo Boo
Breaking Amish
Breaking the Faith
Dating Naked
Devious Maids
The Dr. Oz Show
The Exes
The Golden Girls
Gypsy Brides US
OutDaughtered
I Didn't Know I Was Pregnant
Last Chance Saloon
Long Island Medium
Mistresses
My Mother Is Obsessed
My Lottery Dream Home
My Strange Addiction
The Nanny
Oprah's Lifeclass
Oprah's Next Chapter
Toddlers & Tiaras
Say Yes to the Dress
Scorned
Secret Princes
Super Soul Sunday
Swinger Wives
Teleshopping
Your Style in His Hands

Original commissions
Celebrity Fat Fighters
Jodie Marsh On...
Last Chance Salon
My Naked Secret
Ultimate Shopper
Undercover Mums
Your Style in His Hands
The Charlotte Crosby Experience
If Katie Hopkins Ruled the World
Katie Price's Pony Club
Say Yes to the Dress: UK
Curvy Brides Boutique - filmed in Essex

References

External links

Television channels in the United Kingdom
Television stations in Ireland
Television channels and stations established in 2013
UK and Ireland
Warner Bros. Discovery EMEA